Meloidogyne artiellia, the British root-knot nematode, is a plant pathogenic nematode, infecting barley and chickpea. It is also an invasive species.

See also 
 List of barley diseases
 List of chickpea diseases

References 

 Franklin, M.T. A British root-knot nematode, Meloidogyne artiellia n.sp. J Helminthol. 1961; Suppl 1961:85-92. No abstract available.

External links 
 Nemaplex, University of California - Meloidogyne artiellia

Tylenchida
Agricultural pest nematodes
Barley diseases
Pulse crop diseases
Nematodes described in 1961